Alemdar is a Turkish word originated from Persian word "علمدار(/ælæmdɑːr/)" meaning "standard-bearer". It may refer to:

People
 Alemdar Mustafa Pasha (died 1808), Ottoman grand vizier of Albanian origin

Other uses
 Alemdar (ship) a Turkish ship which is known for her activities in the Independence War of Turkey
 TCG Alemdar (A-601), submarine rescue mother ship of the Turkish Navy

See also
 Bayraktar (surname)